A.S.D. Nuova Santa Maria delle Mole Marino (formerly A.S.D. Nuova Santa Maria delle Mole) is an Italian football club based in Marino, Lazio. Currently, it plays in Italy's Serie D. In this team had played the Italian rapper Il Tre.

History

Foundation 
The club was founded in 1978.

Serie D 
In the season 2012–13 the team was promoted for the first time from Eccellenza Lazio/A to Serie D and changed denomination to the current one.

Colors and badge 
The team's color are light blue and white.

Stadium 
It plays at the Stadio Comunale Domenico Fiore, in Marino, Italy with capacity of 3,000 places.

References 

Football clubs in Italy
Association football clubs established in 1978
Football clubs in Lazio
1978 establishments in Italy
Sport in the Metropolitan City of Rome Capital